Lolo-Bouenguidi is a department of Ogooué-Lolo Province in central-eastern Gabon. The capital lies at Koulamoutou. It had a population of 30,643 in 2013.

Towns and villages

References

Ogooué-Lolo Province
Departments of Gabon